Joseph Linsey (May 27, 1899 – November 24, 1994)  was an organized crime figure in Boston's underworld during the Prohibition era, associated with Joseph Kennedy and Meyer Lansky, and later became a prominent businessman and philanthropist, specifically making contributions to Brandeis University. In 1960, he was the national chairman of the Brandeis Athletic Associations.

Biography
Born in Russia, he immigrated to the United States as a child and later grew up in Boston. After his father died, he went to work at the age of nine delivering groceries and later became apprenticed as a meatcutter.  At the start of Prohibition, the 21-year-old Linsey began bootlegging illegal liquor with Charles "King" Solomon from a front business, the National Realty Company. He also bought Canadian liquor from the Bronfmans and, although serving a year for violations of the Volstead Act, he was acquitted from his two later indictments on similar charges. He was alleged by Vinnie Teresa to have been involved in wholesale gambling in the time after the Prohibition era. He died in Florida of natural causes in 1994.

References

 Ex‐Head of Schenley Industries Is Linked to Crime ‘Consortium’ The New York Times February 19, 1971 
 Hartford Judge Backs Newspaper The New York Times March 23, 1973 
 Publisher Loses In Connecticut The New York Times May 18, 1975 
 Dollar Settles a $5 Million Connecticut Libel Suit The New York Times June 13, 1976

Further reading
 Etzkowitz, Henry and Peter Schwab. Is America Necessary?: Conservative, Liberal, & Socialist Perspectives of United States Political Institutions. St. Paul: West Publishing Co., 1976. 
 Fox, Stephen. Blood and Power: Organized Crime in Twentieth-Century America. New York: William Morrow and Company, 1989. 
 Fried, Albert. The Rise and Fall of the Jewish Gangster in America. New York: Holt, Rinehart and Winston, 1980. 
 Lacey, Robert. Little Man: Meyer Lansky and the Gangster Life. London: Century, 1991. 
 Stein, Benjamin J. A License to Steal: The Untold Story of Michael Milken and the Conspiracy to Bilk the Nation. New York: Simon & Schuster, 1992. 
 Summers, Anthony. Official and Confidential: The Secret Life of J. Edgar Hoover. New York: G.P. Putnam's Sons, 1993. 
 Smith, Joseph History of The American Greyhound Derby: The Kentucky Derby of Greyhound Racing. Boston: Big Jackpot Betting, 2011. 
 Temple, Robert The History of Greyhound Racing in New England. Boston: Xlibris Corp, 2010/ 

1899 births
Year of death missing
Jewish American gangsters